Lord John Stewart (23 October 1621 – 29 March 1644) was a Scottish aristocrat who served as a Royalist commander in the English Civil War. He was one of six sons of Esmé Stewart, 3rd Duke of Lennox and his wife Katherine Clifton, 2nd Baroness Clifton, and the brother of James Stewart, 1st Duke of Richmond.

With his youngest brother, Lord Bernard Stewart, he embarked on a three-year tour of the continent in 1639, before returning to join the King's cause in the Civil War as a General.  He was killed on 29 March 1644 at the Battle of Cheriton near New Alresford in Hampshire.

Only one of his brothers, Lodovic, survived the war to see the restoration of the monarchy in 1660.

Bibliography

1621 births
1644 deaths
17th-century Scottish people
English generals
John Stewart
People killed in the English Civil War
Royalist military personnel of the English Civil War
Younger sons of dukes
Younger sons of barons